Mark Nenow (born November 16, 1957) is a retired long-distance runner from the United States. He ran an American record in the 10,000 meters, with a result of 27 minutes, 20.56 seconds in Brussels, Belgium on September 5, 1986; it stood as a national record until May 4, 2001.

Running career
Nenow attended Anoka High School in Minnesota. Although he did not take up running until his upper-class years in high school, he graduated from Anoka with personal-best times of 4:22 in the mile and 9:17 in the 2-mile. He subsequently attended and ran with University of Kentucky, with whom he competed in cross country and track and field. He spent much of his time in Kentucky following a high-mileage protocol, often running 140 miles per week. As a senior undergrad at Kentucky he qualified for the Olympic Trials in 1980 (even though the US ended up boycotting the 1980 Summer Olympics). He ran professionally for Nike, Puma, and ASICS.

Achievements

References

External links

 1984 Year Ranking

1957 births
Living people
Track and field athletes from Minneapolis
American male long-distance runners
Kentucky Wildcats men's track and field athletes
Athletes (track and field) at the 1983 Pan American Games
Pan American Games bronze medalists for the United States
Pan American Games medalists in athletics (track and field)
World Athletics Championships athletes for the United States
Medalists at the 1983 Pan American Games
Anoka High School alumni